The Federal Reserve Bank of Kansas City Omaha Branch is one of three branches of the Federal Reserve Bank of Kansas City.
The branch, which is in Omaha, Nebraska, opened on September 4, 1917.

Current Board of Directors
The following people are on the board of directors as of 2020:

Appointed by the Federal Reserve Bank

Appointed by the Board of Governors

See also

 Federal Reserve Act
 Federal Reserve System
 Federal Reserve Bank
 Federal Reserve Districts
 Federal Reserve Branches
 Federal Reserve Bank of Kansas City
 Federal Reserve Bank of Kansas City Denver Branch
 Federal Reserve Bank of Kansas City Oklahoma City Branch
 Structure of the Federal Reserve System

References

Federal Reserve branches
Federal Reserve Bank of Kansas City
1917 establishments in Nebraska